Benin Airport  is an airport serving Benin City, the capital of Edo State in Nigeria. The runway is in the middle of the city.

Airlines and destinations

Statistics

See also
Transport in Nigeria
List of airports in Nigeria
List of the busiest airports in Africa

References

External links

SkyVector Aeronautical Charts
OurAirports - Benin

Airports in Nigeria
Benin City